2015 Regional League Division 2 Southern Region is the 7th season of the League competition since its establishment in 2009. It is in the third tier of the Thai football league system.

Changes from last season

Team changes

Promoted clubs

Prachuap Khiri Khan were promoted to the 2015 Thai Division 1 League.

Renamed clubs

 Ranong renamed Ranong United.
 Yala renamed Yala United.

Withdrawn clubs

Hat Yai have withdrawn from the 2015 campaign.

Clubs serving bans
 Phattalung – 2015 campaign.

Teams

Stadium and locations

League table

References

External links
 Kondivision 2

Regional League South Division seasons